Love Is Payable is a 1997 Chinese-language period romance television series produced by Young Pei-pei, set in the Shanghai International Settlement during the Second Sino-Japanese War (which was policed by British and Americans before 1941 even after Shanghai fell to the Japanese in 1937). The series was filmed in Tianjin and Shanghai and first broadcast on Taiwan's Formosa Television.

Originally, Anita Mui was the first choice to play Xiangxue'er, and Stephen Chow was the first choice for the role of Bai Lang.  However, they were unavailable, so Carina Lau and Steven Ma were cast instead.

In 2010, Young Pei-pei produced a remake, titled Entangling Love in Shanghai in English (the Chinese title remains the same).

Cast
Carina Lau as Xiangxue'er
Steve Ma as Bai Lang
Leanne Liu as Bai Ping
Lee Li-chun as Qiao Xiannong
Lawrence Ng as Zhang Guiting
Sun Xing as Ma Xianliang
Angus Tung as Chen Congming
Song Chunli as Hu Ying
Lu Wen as Liao Wanzhen
Yue Yueli as Han Dong
Chen Zihan as Yang Ming
Doze Niu as Da Mi
Chu Zhong-heng as Rong San
Dong Xiaoyan

Awards and nominations

References

1997 Taiwanese television series debuts
1997 Taiwanese television series endings
1997 Chinese television series debuts
1997 Chinese television series endings
Television shows filmed in Shanghai
Television shows filmed in Tianjin
Television shows set in Shanghai
Television series set in the 1930s
Television series set in the 1940s
Mandarin-language television shows